The 1902 St. Louis Browns season was the first for the franchise in St. Louis, after moving from Milwaukee. The team finished second in the American League with a record of 78 wins and 58 losses.

Regular season 
The Milwaukee Brewers had decided to move the team to St. Louis in 1902. The ownership chose the name Browns on purpose. The Browns was the name of the St. Louis Club that won American Association titles from 1885 to 1889. That team moved to the National League in 1892, became the Perfectos in 1899 and finally the Cardinals in 1900.

The new team quickly tried to align itself with fans by raiding the rival St. Louis Cardinals. A couple of Cardinals players were signed, including slick fielding future Hall of Fame shortstop Bobby Wallace and 1901 National League batting champion outfielder Jesse Burkett. The moves paid off for the team. While playing as the Brewers in 1901, the team had a record of 48 wins and 89 losses. In 1902, the Browns had 78 wins and finished in second place in the American League.

Season standings

Record vs. opponents

Roster

Player stats

Batting

Starters by position 
Note: Pos = Position; G = Games played; AB = At bats; H = Hits; Avg. = Batting average; HR = Home runs; RBI = Runs batted in

Other batters 
Note: G = Games played; AB = At bats; H = Hits; Avg. = Batting average; HR = Home runs; RBI = Runs batted in

Pitching

Starting pitchers 
Note: G = Games pitched; IP = Innings pitched; W = Wins; L = Losses; ERA = Earned run average; SO = Strikeouts

Other pitchers 
Note: G = Games pitched; IP = Innings pitched; W = Wins; L = Losses; ERA = Earned run average; SO = Strikeouts

Relief pitchers 
Note: G = Games pitched; W = Wins; L = Losses; SV = Saves; ERA = Earned run average; SO = Strikeouts

Notes

References 
1902 St. Louis Browns team page at Baseball Reference
1902 St. Louis Browns season at baseball-almanac.com

St. Louis Browns seasons
Saint Louis Browns season
Inaugural Major League Baseball seasons by team
St Louis